Jean Henri Bertin (5 September 1917 – 21 December 1975) was a French scientist, engineer and inventor. He was born in Druyes-les-Belles-Fontaines and died in Neuilly-sur-Seine. He is best known as the lead engineer for the French experimental Aérotrain mass transit system.

He studied at the École Polytechnique (graduating in 1938) and at the École nationale supérieure de l'aéronautique et de l'espace. From 1944 he worked for the French National Society for the Development of Aircraft Engines (Société nationale d'études et de construction de moteurs d'aviation).

In 1955 he founded the company Bertin & Cie, whose most famous activity was the development of the Aérotrain. Bertin died just over a year and a half after the French government had terminated the contract for a planned Aérotrain line between Cergy and La Défense.

References

French aerospace engineers
École Polytechnique alumni
Supaéro alumni
20th-century French engineers
1917 births
1975 deaths
20th-century French inventors
Space program of France